Kadugannawa Ambalama (Sinhala:කඩුගන්නාව අම්බලම) is a historic wayside rest that is found – on the left, when traveling from Colombo to Kandy, a few metres before the Kadugannawa Hairpin turn aka Kadugannawa pass. Built in the early 19th century during the British colonial rule in Ceylon (now Sri Lanka), the Ambalama is now more than 200 years old
 A popular stopover for horsemen and merchants traveling from the lowlands to the ancient hill capital Kandy, this structure resembles the Kandyan Era architecture and is of archaeological value. It was renovated by the Ministry of Tourism under the technical guidance of the Department of Archeology at a cost of Rs. 300,000.00 and now this structure is considered a national heritage item of Sri Lanka.

References

External links

 

Tourist attractions in Sabaragamuwa Province
Buildings and structures in Sabaragamuwa Province
Archaeological protected monuments in Kegalle District